Babangon Ako't Dudurugin Kita (International title: Sweet Revenge /  and Crush You) is a 2008 Philippine television drama series broadcast by GMA Network. The series is based on a 1989 Philippine film of the same title. Directed by Joel Lamangan, it stars Yasmien Kurdi and JC de Vera. It premiered on March 24, 2008 on the network's Telebabad line up. The series concluded on June 27, 2008 with a total of 70 episodes.

Cast and characters

Lead cast
JC de Vera as Derek Perantes / Rod
Yasmien Kurdi as Salve Dizon de Leon / Emma Perantes

Supporting cast
Dina Bonnevie as Evita Gomez Perantes
Marvin Agustin as Alfred De Leon
Angelika dela Cruz as Via Fausto
Tonton Gutierrez as Jango San Juan
Paolo Contis as Tyrone San Juan
Glydel Mercado as Imelda / Verna
Diana Zubiri as Julie Maceda San Juan

Recurring cast
Tony Mabesa as Governor Fausto
LJ Reyes as Joanna Marie 'Joey' Salcedo
Jay Aquitania as Juno San Juan
Patrick Garcia as Lawrence Fajardo
Robert Ortega as Fredo
Dion Ignacio as  Pablo
Jenny Miller as Beverly Castro 
Mart Escudero as Roman
Arthur Solinap as Harry
Stef Prescott as Courtney
Paolo Serrano as Jake Sanchez

Guest cast
Ian De Leon as Melvin
Jennica Garcia as Teen Julie Maceda-San Juan
Joseph Bitangcol as Teen Tyrone San Juan
Caloy Alde as Ariel
Hanni Miller as Agnes
Lizzy Pecson as Belen
Chariz Solomon as Jadane
Paulo Avelino as Brenan
Mike Magat as Ruben
Andrew Schimmer as Dennis
Maybelline dela Cruz as Dolly dela Cruz
Juan Rodrigo as Arturo Salcedo
Emilio Garcia as Emilio Perantes
Roi Vinzon as Roberto

Ratings
According to AGB Nielsen Philippines' Mega Manila household television ratings, the pilot episode of Babangon Ako't Dudurugin Kita earned a 28% rating.

Accolades

References

External links
 

2008 Philippine television series debuts
2008 Philippine television series endings
Filipino-language television shows
GMA Network drama series
Live action television shows based on films
Philippine crime television series
Philippine political television series
Television shows based on comics
Television shows set in the Philippines